Francis Mwanzia Nyenze (June 2, 1957 – December 6, 2017) was a Kenyan politician who served as Member of Parliament for Kitui West Constituency from 1997 to 2002 and again from 2013 to 2017. He served as Minister for Environment from 1997 until 2001 and Minister for Heritage and Sports from 2001 to 2002. He also served as the Leader of Minority in the National Assembly in the 11th Parliament of Kenya from 2013 to 2017. He passed on at The Nairobi Hospital after battling colon cancer for close to a decade.

Early life

Nyenze was born in Kyondoni village, Kabati in the present day Kitui County. His father the late Reverend Philip Nyenze Mwambu was a renowned Africa Inland Church minister.

References

1957 births
2017 deaths
Wiper Democratic Movement – Kenya politicians
People from Kitui County
Kamba people
Government ministers of Kenya
Members of the National Assembly (Kenya)
University of Nairobi alumni
Kenya African National Union politicians